"17" is a song by Italian rapper Madame. It was released on 17 June 2019 by Sugar Music, and produced by Eiemgei and Mago Del Blocco.

In December 2020, the song was certified gold by the Federation of the Italian Music Industry, denoting 35,000 equivalent units in Italy. By 31 August 2022, the music video on YouTube has gathered more than 10 million views.

Music video
The music video for "17", directed by Dalilù, premiered on 26 June 2019 via Madame's YouTube channel.

Track listing

Certifications

References

2019 songs
2019 singles
Madame (singer) songs
Sugar Music singles